Lo Chih-ming (born 13 November 1957) is a Taiwanese politician who served in the Legislative Yuan from 2002 to 2008.

Education
Lo attended National Kaohsiung Normal University in Taiwan before earning a master's degree from St. Cloud State University. He then earned a doctorate in technology in 1991 at the University of Iowa.

Political career
Lo served four terms in the Kaohsiung City Council as a member of the Kuomintang. He joined the Taiwan Solidarity Union upon its founding in 2001 to run for a legislative seat in Kaohsiung. In 2003, TSU legislator Su Yin-kuei was expelled from the party after charging Lo with illegal lobbying. Despite the accusations, Lo won reelection in 2004 by partnering with Democratic Progressive Party candidates during the campaign, and was named one of the TSU's four caucus whips at the start of his second term. In January 2005, Lo dropped out of a TSU chairmanship election, and Shu Chin-chiang was appointed to the position. After participating in an April 2005 protest, Lo was charged with violating the Assembly and Parade Law, and stepped down as whip until he was cleared. In February 2006, Lo declared his candidacy for the Kaohsiung mayoralty. As mayor, Lo said he would increase childcare subsidies, and expand the city's tourism industry. He also proposed an educational program that would offer elementary school textbooks for free. Chen Chu won the office, and Lo returned to the legislature. In his second reelection campaign, Lo originally stood as a Kaohsiung district incumbent, but was named one of the TSU's proportional representation candidates. Listed eighth on a closed party list, Lo was defeated. Shortly after the loss, he rejoined the Kuomintang.

After politics, Lo worked at the Xiamen subsidiary of a biotech company and led a property developer.

Espionage allegation
In January 2023, Lo was arrested and questioned by prosecutors who alleged that he recruited retired admiral Hsia Fu-hsiang (夏復翔) and others into a mainland Chinese spy ring. A court in Kaohsiung released him on cash bail despite the investigators' request that he remain in custody.

References

1957 births
Living people
Politicians of the Republic of China on Taiwan from Pingtung County
Kaohsiung Members of the Legislative Yuan
Taiwan Solidarity Union Members of the Legislative Yuan
Members of the 5th Legislative Yuan
Members of the 6th Legislative Yuan
University of Iowa alumni
St. Cloud State University alumni
Kuomintang politicians in Taiwan